Guilin Liangjiang International Airport  is the airport serving the city of Guilin in Guangxi Zhuang Autonomous Region, China.

In 2014, Guilin Liangjiang International Airport was the 33rd busiest airport in China with 5,875,327 passengers. Around 4 million passengers transit through Liangjiang Airport annually, traveling to one of the 48 domestic and international destinations served nonstop from Guilin.

History
In September 1991, the State Council of China and the Central Military Commission approved a 1.85 billion yuan project to build a new airport to replace Guilin Qifengling Airport as Guilin's civil airport. Construction began in July 1993, and Liangjiang Airport was opened on 1 October 1996.

Liangjiang Airport now features a 3,200 meter-long runway, a 150,000 square meter large parking apron, 20 gate positions, and a 50,000 square meter large terminal building. The airport has also invested 20 million yuan into improving Liangjiang International's aesthetics and making the airport more environmentally-friendly. The airport has received several awards for their efforts.

Starting from 30 September 2018, all flights from Terminal 1 have been moved to Terminal 2. Terminal 2 has a floor area of 100,000 square meters, 22 security lanes which 17 for domestic and 5 for International and 25 boarding gate, the designed capacity to handle 12 million passengers and 95,000 tons of cargo a year. The construction of Terminal 2 started in December 2015 and it was opened on September 30, 2018, at a total cost of 3.258 billion yuan. Following the opening of the new Terminal 2, Terminal 1 was closed temporarily for renovation. A new apron and taxi lanes have been built and opened along with the new terminal.

Airlines and destinations

References

External links

 Guilin Liangjiang International Airport
 List of countries under 72-hour Visa-free Transit Policy in Guilin
 Visa-free requirements
 Photos of the airport's inauguration

Airports in Guangxi
Airports established in 1996
1996 establishments in China
Buildings and structures in Guilin